Tomasz Ziętek (born 28 June 1989, Inowrocław) is a Polish film and theatre actor as well as musician and guitarist.

Life and career
Ziętek was born on 7 May 1989 in Inowrocław. He graduated from the Bolesław III Wrymouth High School No. 1 in Słupsk, and completed studies at the Danuta Baduszkowa National Vocal and Drama School in Gdynia.

In 2007, Ziętek won the Grand Prix of the "Niemen Non Stop" Festival of Young Talents in Słupsk, Poland. In 2005, he made his theatre debut by performing in Betlejem Polskie ("Polish Bethlehem"), a play staged in the New Theatre in Słupsk. In 2011, he played his first major film role of Zbigniew Godlewski in Antoni Krauze's  drama film Black Thursday, which recounts the events of the Polish protests of 1970. His other prominent roles include Jan Bytnar in Robert Gliński's 2014 war drama Stones for the Rampart and "Ronaldo" in Marcin Wrona's 2015 horror film Demon. For his roles in Cicha noc ("Silent Night"; 2017) and Jan Komasa's 2019 Academy-Award-nominated Corpus Christi, he received Polish Film Award nominations for Best Supporting Actor. In 2019, he appeared in BBC war drama TV series World on Fire written by Peter Bowker.

Personal life
He is a vocalist and guitarist of the Tricity-based The Fruitcakes music band. He also created his solo music project The Ape Man Tales.

Filmography
2011: Czarny czwartek (Black Thursday) as Zbigniew Godlewski
2013: Na dobre i na złe (TV series) as Jarek (episode 545)
2014: Kamienie na szaniec as Jan Bytnar
2014: Upload as Demolka Man
2015: Body as attorney's assistant
2015: Carte Blanche as Wojtek Madejski
2015: Pakt as a journalist
2015: Demon as Ronaldo
2016: Konwój as Feliks
2017: Żużel as Lowa	
2017: Cicha noc as Paweł	
2018: Kamerdyner as Max von Krauss	
2019: Odwróceni. Ojcowie i córki (TV series) as Daniel	
2019: Corpus Christi as Pinczer	
2019: World on Fire (TV series) as Tomasz
2020: Tarapaty 2 as Karol Wróblewski
2021: Leave No Traces
2021: Operation Hyacinth as Robert Mrozowski

See also
Polish cinema
Polish Film Awards

References

1989 births
Living people
People from Słupsk
Polish male actors
Polish male stage actors
Polish musicians
21st-century Polish actors
Polish male television actors
People from Inowrocław
Polish film actors